Hitechjet were an English rock band from Uxbridge, London, formed in 2001. Hitechjet released one mini album "If you take anything..." and one full-length album "600 miles from..." through In At The Deep End Records. Hitechjet has been on hiatus since 2006 except for two shows in July 2012.

Formation
Hitechjet formed in Autumn 2001 by Paul Bevan (bass), Adam Gardner (guitar), Aydogan Mehmet (guitar) and Micky Wyle (drums). They were joined at the beginning of 2002 by Brian Ayers(vocals) and became Hitechjet after a line from the Nena song 99 Red Balloons.

Hitechjet recorded their first demo with John Hannon (Hundred Reasons, Kids Near Water) engineering and producing. The demo contained the songs 'The Score', 'If my best is not enough' and 'All this time'. The demo received positive reviews from fanzines and sparked interest from several record labels interested in releasing their material.

Nottingham based label In At the Deep End Records were due to attend their band The Killerest Expression's show in Leeds when Hitechjet were added to the bill.  Although this was only their second show, based on their performance that night offered Hitechjet a recording contract.

If you take anything
In June 2003 Hitechjet released, 'If you take anything...', a 7 track mini-album which received critical acclaim in many magazines and fanzines including Kerrang (4K), Big Cheese (4/5) and Drowned in Sound (9/10). This led to shows with Lagwagon, Get Cape. Wear Cape. Fly, Kasabian, Instruction, Red Animal War, Million Dead amongst others.

600 miles from...
The album was recorded, engineered and produced by longtime producer John Hannon. The album was presented to In At the Deep End Records in October 2004.

A 14-date first UK headline tour was booked for February 2005 to coincide with the release of the album. Artwork issues delayed the release of the album, and this led to Hitechjet leaving for their tour with their friends Driving on the Right without an album to promote. This was their most successful tour to date with several shows selling out.

Due to a busy release schedule, In At the Deep End Records finally released "600 miles from..." in October 2005. Although Hitechjet were known for their "genre hopping" style, '600 miles from...' explored new areas for Hitechjet with elements of post rock, electronica and post punk and contained heavy use of samples.

The album was greeted with strong reviews receiving 8/10 in Rock Sound, 5/5 Big Cheese, 5/5 Zero Magazine, 4.5/5 Punktastic.com.

After playing 'Making Movies' regularly on his show, Radio One DJ Mike Davies, invited Hitechjet to record a session for the Lock Up show at the end of 2005. They played live '(I should have left you at the) Roadside', 'Perfect Video (full band version)', 'This Lift goes down' and 'As though nothing happened'.

In April 2006, after touring with The Once Over Twice, Hitechjet announced an "indefinite hiatus".

In July 2012, Hitechjet reformed for two  shows in London. One with Milloy for their final London show, and the other for a friend's private party.

Line-up
 Adam Gardner - guitars
 Aydogan Mehmet (aka "Mem") - guitar, vocals
 Brian Ayers - lead vocals
 Michael Wyle (aka "Micky") - drums, vocals
 Paul Bevan (aka "Bev") - bass, vocals

Discography

Albums
 600 miles from... (2005)

Mini album
 If you take anything... (2003)

Compilations
 Punk Academy Volume 1  - (2003, features "The Score- (original demo)")

Post Hitechjet
Micky Wyle performed for a reformed Senseless Things (filling in for Morgan Nicholls, who was unavailable) for a secret (billed as Mark Keds) four-song performance at Islington Academy, London on 4 March 2007 – over twelve years after the band last performed – as part of a gig to celebrate the life of former Mega City Four frontman Darren "Wiz" Brown, who died in December 2006.

References

External links
 Myspace page
  'All this time'(live) YouTube

British post-hardcore musical groups
English alternative rock groups